Skartabellat (lat. scartabellat) was a specific form of nobilitation in Polish–Lithuanian Commonwealth. Introduced by pacta conventa of 1669, ennoblement into a sort of lower nobility. Skartabels could not hold public offices or be members of the Sejm.

After 3 generations in noble ranks these families would "mature" to peerage. Most scartabellats came from burghers; the institution was abolished in 1817.

See also
 Ennoblement
 Heraldic adoption
 Indygenat

Sources
 Oswald Balzer: "Skartabelat w ustroju szlachetstwa polskiego", Kraków, 1911

Polish–Lithuanian Commonwealth
Polish nobility
Legal history of Poland